Songbird, also alternatively titled Alright Now, is a 2018 British comedy-drama film written, and directed by Jamie Adams. It stars Cobie Smulders, Richard Elis and Jessica Hynes. The film depicts the story of a rock singer who leaves her music band and enrolls in a university's marine biology program. The film was improvised, and shot in the course of five days.

Cast
Cobie Smulders as Joanne Skye
Richard Elis as Pete
Jessica Hynes as Sara
Laura Patch as Kelly
Daisy Haggard as Olivia
Emily Atack as Mandy
Noel Clarke as Larry
Holli Dempsey as Tara
Mandeep Dhillon as Susie
Tara Lee as Hannah

Release
Alright Now was released in select theatres in United States, and on video on demand on 7 September 2018.

Reception
Andrew McArthur of The People's Movies.com gave the film 3 out of 5. Samantha Incorvaia of azcentral.com gave the film rating of 1.5 out of 5.

References

External links
 
 
 

2018 films
British comedy-drama films
2010s English-language films
Films directed by Jamie Adams
2010s British films